In molecular biology, S4 domain refers to a small RNA-binding protein domain found in a ribosomal protein named uS4 (called S9 in eukaryotes). The S4 domain is approximately 60-65 amino acid residues long, occurs in a single copy at various positions in different proteins and was originally found in pseudouridine syntheses, a bacterial ribosome-associated protein.

The S4 protein helps to initiate assembly of the 16S rRNA. In this way proteins serve to organise and stabilise the rRNA tertiary structure.

Function
The function of the S4 domain is to be an RNA-binding protein. S4 is a multifunctional protein, and it must bind to the 16S ribosomal RNA. In addition, the S4 domain binds a complex pseudoknot and represses translation. More specifically, this protein domain delivers nucleotide-modifying enzymes to RNA and to regulates translation through structure specific RNA binding.

Structure

The S4 protein domain is composed of three alpha helices and five beta strands. It is organized as an antiparallel sheet in a Greek key motif.

References

Protein domains
Genetics